Vaduvur Veeravalli Srinivasa Desikachariar (4 November 1928 — 9 September 2014) was an Indian scholar. He studied Sanskrit and published several books. In 2001, he received the Rashtrapathi Award from the President of India as a Sanskrit scholar, one of the highest awards awarded by the Indian state.

Life and contribution 
Vaduvur (Vaduvoor) Veeravalli Sri Srinivasa Desikachariar Swami was born in Vaduvur, India on 4 November 1928 (Vibhava Varusham Aippasi Maasam Pushya Nakshatram), to Srimathi Kanakavalli and Sri Veeraraghavachariar. 
 
Five generations of his ancestors were trained in Veda Adhyayis and were rendering service to Srimad Andavan Ashramam without compensation
 
His uncle (Chitappa), Ganapadi Sri Narasimhachariar, was one of the great Veda teachers of those days, teaching in the famous Veda Patasala in Mannargudi founded by Sri Anna Swami Iyengar (continued by his son, A. Srinivasa Iyengar Swami). In fact, he introduced the weekly tests in Veda Patasalas in Tamil Nadu modelled after the Kerala pattern.  
When his father died when he was 12, the young Desikachariar was enrolled by his uncle, in that Patasala and started training in Divya Prabandham from Kanthadai Ramanujachariar Swami and later Veda Adhyayanam from his uncle. 
He completed Veda Adhyayanam (up to Kramantham) in seven years and completed the Ganantham and then Salakshanam (equivalent to PhD) in just one more year. He was examined at the Sankara Mutt and cleared these in First Class.

As Yajamana Bhakti, when Sri Desikachariar was honoured with the President Award in 2001, he went straight to Mannargudi and sought the blessings of A Srinivasa Iyengar Swami, his well wisher and founder of Mannargudi Veda Pata Sala and then later visited his own house in Vaduvur.

Prapathi/Saranagathi 

Our Swami had his Prapatthi performed at a very tender age by Srimad Therazhundur Andavan Swami and Samasrayanam under Akkur Andavan Swami. Thus, he along with Sri Thenbirai Lakshmi Raghavachariar remains one of the few living sishyas with links to six Acharya Sreshtas of the Andavan Parampara.

Our Swami and late Sri Kanchi Paramacharya 

While Sri Desikachariar was 13 years old and having training in Prabandha Adyayenam, Kanchi Paramacharya Sri Chandrashekarendra Saraswati Swami was visiting Mannargudi. The great Sage had tremendous respect for the Mannargudi family. Srinivasa Iyengar introduced the young scholar to Paramacharya, who asked the boy to recite the "Koondhal malar mangaikkum man madanthaikkum". Young Sri Desikachariar recited this Pasuram in a resounding manner and was blessed by the Paramacharya. 
 
Later, Sri Desikachariar's Ganantham Pariksha was conducted by none other than Late Kanchi Paramacharya himself.

Tremendously impressed by the then young Yajur Veda Ganapadi, Paramacharya appointed him as a Parikshaadhikari (examiner) for the Vedic Exams conducted by Sankara Mutt Patasalas and our swami performed this task for nearly 55 years before he gracefully let others do that job.

Kanchi Paramacharya Sri Chandrashekarendra Saraswati Swami continued to be his Guide and Philosopher for more than 50 years.

During the time, Sri Kanchi Paramacharya desired that Sri Desikachariar should publish some authoritative works on Dharma Saastra. Desikachariar located the Telugu edition of "Pithru Medha Saram" originally done by Vaideeka Sarvabhouma Thozhappar, and translated to Devanagari with all Pramanams and a Tamizh vyakyanam.

Awards and recognition 

In 2001, Sri Desikachariar was honoured Rashtrapathi Award by the President of India as a Sanskrit Scholar, one of the highest awards given by the Indian State by President K.R. Narayanan.,

In addition, he was
 The Chief Examiner of Vedic knowledge at Srirangam Srimad Andavan Ashramam, Ahobila Mutt, Parakala Mutt,Mysore; Sri Kanchi Mutt; Tirumala Tirupati Devasthanams; Uttaradhi Mutt, Mysore.

Additionally,
 HH Srimad (Srimushnam) Andavan appointed him as the Srikaryam of Srirangam Srimad Andavan Asramam in October 2007
 He has authored the magnum opus " Pithru Medah Saaram " – a text book on Dharma Saastraa
 He has officiated as the Brihaspathi in nearly 44 Chatur Maasya Sanakalpams by three Yathis of the Andavan Ashramam without break from 1963 to 2006
 Involved and recognised by many more mutts and organisations
 He was the direct charge of Vaduvur (Vaduvoor) Veda Patasala 

He also officiated Brihaspathi when Five Acharyas took to Holy Orders (ThuriAsramam or Sanyasaasramam)
 Srimad Thirukkudanthai Andavan,
 Srimad Mysore Andavan,
 the 45th Jeer of Sri Ahobila Mutt,
 the 46th Jeer of Sri Ahobila Mutt and
 Prakrutham Srimad Srimushnam Andavan

Chief priest for Aswameda Yajna Ratri Homa conducted in Hyderabad in 1985. Performed Homas as prescribed by scriptures

Academic Qualification 

Salaksha Ganapadi in Krishna Yajur Vedam
Passed Veda Bashya conducted by Sri Kanchi Kamakoti Peetam, Kanchipuram
Passed Drhyaganam conducted by Sri Veda Dharma Sastra Paripalana Sabha, Kumbakonam

Passed 
 Apastamba
 Bodhyana
 Aswalayana
 Drahyayana Sutras with Purva and Apara Prayoga at Mysore
 Mastered Nalayira Divya Prapandam 
 Special study of Purva and Uttara Mimamsa Sastras

Specialization
Sribashya of Srimad Ramanuja and Sri Vedanta Desikar's works under the holiness of Srimad Andavan of Srirangam Periyashramam

A Rare Combination
A rare combination of Salakshana Veda Ghana Pata along with the commentaries (Veda Bashya), the application of ritualistic rites that are laid down in the Srauta Sutras and Grhya Sutras, the mastery of Purva Mimansa Sastra and the command over the Vedanta Sastra

Languages / Scripts / Lipis known 
Languages- Sanskrit, Tamil, Telugu, Hindi
Scripts/Lipis- Devanagiri, Granta, Tamil, Telugu

Literary Research and scholarly works 
 Written commentary on "Pitrumedha Sara Prasna" and "Sudhi Vilochanam", published for the first time with special annotation from Vedas and Sanskrit Quotations containing 500 pages
 A Book on "Purva and Apara Prayoga" that was published in 1996
 An authority on "Apastamba Grhya Sutras and Pancharatra Agama Sastras"

Have made detailed comparative study of different "Srauta" and "Grhya Sutras" such as
 Apastamba
 Bodhyana
 Aashvalayanam 
 Drakshyayana

"GNANA DEEPAPRAKASHAHA" (in Tamil only) - A new 230+ page book on our Dharmaśāstra, based based on our swami's various articles and question & answers, in Sri Ranganatha Paduka magazine (Srimad Andavan ashram publications) and other publications for many many years

When such an idea for put forth to Srimad Andavan Sri Rangaramanuja Mahadesikan, the acharya not only blessed the initiative, but also provided his blessings on the contents of the book. Similarly 46th Jeeyar of Ahobila Mutt, Srimad Paundaripuram Ashramam Sri Raghuveera Mahadesikan swami and Sri Kanchi Kamakoti Peetam had given their blessings and introduction in the book. 

The book was officially launched on Apr 3, 2016 in Mannurgudi during 71st Vidwat Sathas by Judge Ramasubramanyam, in the presence of 

 Sri Tirupati Ganapati Srinivasan - President of India Awardee for Vedic Contribution and sishya of Sri Vaduvur Desikachariar
 Sri Mani Dravid - President of India Awardee for Vedic Contribution
 Sri Krishnamoorthy Sastrigal - President of India Awardee for Vedic Contribution
 Sri Velukudi Krishnan
 Sri Villur Karunakarachariar
 Sri Narasimhachariar (Ahobila Mutt Aradhagar),
 Madhwa Vidwan Sri Krishnachar

Back to Vaduvur/Vaduvoor 
After teaching in Mannargudi Veda Pata Sala for over 50 years, Sri Desikachariar returned to Vaduvur in 1996 to start Vaduvur Veda Pata Sala and many batches of students have passed out of Pata Sala and currently in Vaidhigam and Vedic services all across India and abroad.
 
Under Sri Desikachariar's guidance, many philanthropic work has been carried forward in the form of Village Improvement and Vaduvur Temple renovation and festival celebrations.

80th birthday (Sathabishekam )

Disciples and well-wishers organised the Sathabishekam (80th Birthday celebration) at Vaduvur on 22 October 2008.

He had a tremendous love for Divya Prabandham. Hence during his 80th Birthday, Divya Prabandha Parayanam was included as an addition. His old friends from school days in Vaduvur School attended the event, including Munuswamy Pillai, Maniam (Vaduvur Mel pathi) and Murugesan (Retd PWD).

The whole village was in festival mood during this time amidst large gathering of local people across the region.
Over 1000 disciples/shishyas across India, representatives from 5 different Mutts and prasadams from 60 different temples were offered in this occasion

Kainkaryam to Vaduvur and Mannargudi Temple 

Under Sri Desikachariar's guidance and support of his students including Ganapadi N.Govindarajan and others, many philanthropic work has been carried forward.
 Renovation of Vaduvur Temple
 Maha Samprokshanam of Vaduvur (Vaduvoor) Temple in 1996 and in 2007
 Every year Sri Ramanavami Utsavam and Theppotsavam (Tank Festival) has been celebrated with 3rd day Sesha Vahanam (Serpant) is directly undertaken by him. Over 100 students across various part of country come for each occasion and celebrate it as their own function.
 Silver Sesha Vaganam for Vaduvur Ramar and Mannargudi Sengamala Thayar (Mannargudi Rajagopalan Temple)·     
 Samarpanam of Swarna Yagnopavitham (Sacred Thread or Poonal) for Vaduvur Ramar. 
 Renovation of Sri Kailasanathar Temple in Vaduvur and conducted the kumbabishekam
 Golden Plating of Sri Ramar's Bow (Dhanush/Kothandam)
 Golden Crown (Kreedam) for Seetha Pirati
 Gold dipped kavacham for Srirama, Sita, Lakshmanar and Hanumar
 Samarpanam of Gold dipped Umbrella (Swarna Chatram)  
 Recently, to build Vaduvur Sport Academy, under his guidance, Sarvabhowmam Ramaswamy Iyengar family had donated a huge ground worth 1.5 million as of today
 In addition, our Swami along with Madapusi Puranam Vaduvur Ahobila Mutt Mudra Kartha Sri Sadagopachariar have never missed any major events at the temple without conducting Veda Parayanam with his students for last 60+ years

Swami, attained Acharyan Thiruvadi, on 9 September 2014.

References

External links

 Vaduvur Temple – a Public website about the temple and activities
 Wiki Page on Vaduvur Village
 Chakravarthy Tirumagan Dharma Paripalana Trust – Vaduvur Trust formed by Sri Desikachariar

1928 births
2014 deaths
People from Tamil Nadu
Indian Sanskrit scholars